Kayla Kecia DiCello ( or   or ) (born January 25, 2004) is an American artistic gymnast. She is the 2021 World all-around bronze medalist. On the junior level, she is the 2019 Junior World vault champion and the 2019 U.S. Junior national all-around champion.  She was an alternate for the 2020 Olympic team.

Personal life 
DiCello was born to Matt and Kecia DiCello in 2004, and has three siblings, two sisters named Karleigh and Kyra and a brother named Hunter. She began gymnastics when she was two.

Gymnastics career

Junior

2016 - 2017 
DiCello was a HOPES gymnast in 2016 and became junior elite in 2017 after qualifying at the Brestyan’s National Qualifier.

2018 
DiCello was officially added to the junior national team after she was named to the team to compete at the 2018 Pacific Rim Gymnastics Championships. There she won gold in the team, vault, and uneven bars and silver in the all-around behind Jordan Bowers. She finished 4th on balance beam. In early July, DiCello competed at the American Classic where she finished first in the all-around with a score of 55.400, posting the highest score of the competition amongst both juniors and seniors. She also finished first on vault and balance beam, second on floor, and third on uneven bars. On July 28, DiCello competed at the 2018 U.S. Classic where she finished second behind Leanne Wong after falling off the balance beam.

With her placements at these three competitions, DiCello entered the August 2018 U.S. National Championships in Boston as one of the favorites for the Junior national title along with Wong, Bowers, and Sunisa Lee. After two days of competition in which she tallied an impressive score of 111.200, DiCello won the silver medal in the all-around competition, once again behind Wong. She performed well on both days of the competition and was the only junior gymnast to score in the top four on all four individual events: fourth on balance beam, third on uneven bars and floor exercise, and first on vault, where she stuck her double-twisting Yurchenko vault on the second day of competition to edge out Wong, the defending champion on the event. After her performance, she was once again named to the national team.

In November, DiCello announced that she had verbally committed to attend the University of Florida on a gymnastics scholarship.

2019 
DiCello competed at the WOGA Classic in early February.  She won the Junior All-Around title with a score of 55.700, outscoring the senior field as well.  Later that month DiCello was named to the team to compete at the 2019 City of Jesolo Trophy.  While there she sustained a calf injury and was only able to compete on uneven bars.  During team finals, she helped the USA win silver behind Russia.

In June DiCello competed at the Junior World Championship Trials.  She placed second behind Skye Blakely and was named to the team to compete at the 2019 Junior World Championships alongside Blakely and Sydney Barros.  Together the team won bronze, finishing behind Russia and China.  Individually she finished fourth in the all-around behind Russians Viktoria Listunova and Vladislava Urazova and Ou Yushan of China.  She was the only competitor that qualified to all four event finals.  On the first day of event finals DiCello won gold on vault, finishing ahead of competitors Jennifer Gadirova of Great Britain and Urazova and finished sixth on uneven bars.  On the second day of event finals she won bronze on balance beam behind Elena Gerasimova of Russia and Wei Xiaoyuan of China and placed seventh on floor exercise.

In July DiCello competed at the U.S. Classic where uncharacteristic falls on the balance beam and floor exercise resulted in an eleventh place finish in the all-around.  She won bronze on uneven bars behind Olivia Greaves and Sydney Morris and placed seventh on vault.

In August DiCello competed at the U.S. National Championships.  After the first day of competition she recorded a score of 56.000 and was in second behind Konnor McClain.  During the second day of competition scored a 56.700, giving her a total combined score of 112.700 which was enough to win the gold in the all-around by one tenth over silver medalist McClain. This score would have placed her third all-around in the senior competition. Additionally DiCello won gold on vault and floor exercise, bronze on uneven bars behind Olivia Greaves and McClain, and placed fourth on balance beam behind McClain, Ciena Alipio, and Skye Blakely. At this competition, DiCello increased her floor difficulty by debuting a full-twisting double layout, or Chusovitina as her first tumbling pass.

Senior

2020 
In January it was announced that DiCello would make her senior debut at the American Cup, taking place on March 7.  She finished in second place behind compatriot Morgan Hurd, with a score of 55.132 in the all-around. She posted the second highest score on vault behind Great Britain’s Jennifer Gadirova and the third highest on floor behind Gadirova and Hurd.

2021 
DiCello competed at the American Classic in April.  She only competed on the uneven bars and on balance beam where she placed second behind Sunisa Lee and fifth respectively.

In May, DiCello competed at the GK US Classic, finishing third in the all-around behind Simone Biles and Jordan Chiles. She also placed first on the uneven bars, tied for ninth on balance beam with Emma Malabuyo, and placed third on floor exercise behind Biles and Chiles.  At the National Championships DiCello finished 11th in the all-around.  She won silver on floor exercise behind Simone Biles.  As a result she was named to the national team and selected to compete at the Olympic Trials.  At the Olympic Trials DiCello finished sixth in the all-around and was named as an alternate for the Olympic team.

In October DiCello was selected to compete at the 2021 World Championships alongside Leanne Wong, Konnor McClain, and eMjae Frazier.  While there she qualified for the all-around final in third place behind Angelina Melnikova and teammate Wong, the floor exercise final in fourth place, and the balance beam final in seventh place. She won third in the all-around final behind Angelina Melnikova and Leanne Wong.

In November DiCello signed her national letter of intent to compete for the Florida Gators.

2022 
In July DiCello was selected to compete at the upcoming Pan American Championships alongside Skye Blakely, Zoe Miller, Elle Mueller, and Lexi Zeiss.  On the first day of competition she won gold on floor exercise and helped the United States qualify to the team final in second place. During the team final DiCello competed on uneven bars, balance beam, and floor exercise, helping the United States win silver behind Brazil.  In August DiCello competed at the National Championships.  She finished finished fourth in the all-around and third on balance beam.

NCAA

2022–2023 season 
DiCello made her collegiate debut on January 6, 2023, in a meet against West Virginia, Ball State, and Lindenwood University.  She competed in the all-around, earning the highest all-around score of the night with a 39.475.

Selected competitive skills

Competitive history

References

External links

2004 births
Living people
American female artistic gymnasts
Medalists at the World Artistic Gymnastics Championships
Medalists at the Junior World Artistic Gymnastics Championships
U.S. women's national team gymnasts
Sportspeople from Montgomery County, Maryland
Florida Gators women's gymnasts
21st-century American women